Polignac may refer to:

 Polignac family, a French noble family, including a list of its members
 Duke of Polignac, a title created in 1780 for the Polignac family
 Polignac (card game), a French card game for four players

Places
 Polignac, Charente-Maritime, a municipality in the Charente-Maritime department, France
 Polignac, Haute-Loire, a municipality in the Haute Loire department, France